Houstonia micrantha, the southern bluet, is a plant species in the coffee family.

It is native to the south-central United States where it has been found in Texas, Louisiana, Arkansas, Mississippi, southern Missouri, Alabama, western Tennessee, extreme western Florida (Escambia County) plus a few isolated locations in Georgia.

References

External links
Photo of herbarium specimen at Missouri Botanical Garden, collected in Missouri, Houstonia micrantha
Southeastern Flora, Houstonia micrantha
Gardening Europe, Houstonia micrantha

micrantha
Flora of the Southeastern United States
Plants described in 1950
Flora without expected TNC conservation status